The Hamburg Exiles Rugby Football Club is a  German rugby union club from Hamburg, currently playing in the Rugby-Regionalliga North. The club organizes a yearly rugby sevens competition called the Hamburg Sevens.

The club fields two teams, the Hamburg Exiles RFC which plays in the Rugby-Regionalliga North and a seeder team, the SG Exiles RFC /HSV II, which plays in the Verbandsliga North.

History

The Hamburg Exiles were formed in 1966 by players of both FC St. Pauli Rugby and Hamburger RC. The event that cause the foundation of the club was a change in the rules of the German Rugby Federation which limited the number of foreign players which could be field during a match. Foreign born players, feeling that their clubs had not protected them from the rule changes decided to fund a new club with a more international orientation.

References

External links 
 Official website
 Official twitter account
  Hamburg Exiles RFC club info at totalrugby.de

Rugby clubs established in 1966
1966 establishments in Germany
club
Rugby union in Hamburg